Ural (Bashkir and ) is a rural locality (a village) in Karansky Selsoviet, Buzdyaksky District, Bashkortostan, Russia. The population was 47 as of 2010. There is 1 street.

Geography 
Ural is located 20 km northeast of Buzdyak (the district's administrative centre) by road. Yuraktau is the nearest rural locality.

References 

Rural localities in Buzdyaksky District